Leaphart is a surname. Notable people with the surname include:

Keith Leaphart (born 1975), American entrepreneur, philanthropist, and physician
Paulette Leaphart (born 1966), American breast cancer survivor and activist
W. William Leaphart (born 1946), Justice of the Montana Supreme Court